Joseph Campau (February 20, 1769 – May 13, 1863) was among the leading citizens and wealthiest landowners in Detroit, Michigan, at the beginning of the 19th century. Campau had three trading posts and a store in Detroit until the early 1800s. He then embarked on a real-estate career that made him very wealthy. Campau was also a newspaper man, establishing a newspaper with his nephew, John R. Williams. He held several city public offices for the city. Campau was an officer in the Michigan Territory Militia and during the War of 1812.

Campau was a Roman Catholic until he was excommunicated for selling whiskey to Native Americans and having joined the Masons.

Early life
Campau was born on February 2, 1769, in Detroit. His parents were Jacques Campau and Catherine Ménard. Campau's great-grandfather, Jacques Campau (1677–1751), left Montreal and settled at Fort Pontchartrain du Détroit in 1708, one year after his brother Michel. Antoine de la Mothe Cadillac founded Fort Pontchartrain du Détroit in 1701 and sold 68 land grants between 1707 and 1710, two of which were sold to the Campau brothers. Jacques had previously served as a secretary and an officer to Cadillac. Jacques sold furs, grains, and bread at "one of the finest merchant stores" in Detroit by the 1740s, according to Clarence M. Burton.

In his youth, Joseph Campau traded with the Native Americans. His younger brother, Barnabé aka Barnabas, was also a wealthy businessman. He was a fur trader, merchant, and landowner. One of his properties was Belle Isle.

Career
Campau began his business career as a merchant. He purchased goods from Boston, the first person to do so in Detroit, and sold them at his store on Atwater. Campau spoke the dialects of several Native American tribes, French and English to his customers at his three trading posts at Saginaw, on Lake St. Clair, and on Lake Erie. He was called Chemokamun ("big shot") by Chief Wawanosh of Sarnia and Chief Maccounse of Lake St. Clair.

Campau was the first in the city's real estate industry to sell and lease houses that had been built on vacant lots. He was sometimes considered a "slum lord" who was likely to charge late fees with high interest rates to delinquent tenants. However, an obituary stated of Campau, "[t]o the honest and industrious, he was always lenient."

C. M. Burton asserts that he was the state's first millionaire. He had become the state's largest landowner, owning property worth more than $10 million. Campau held a large percentage of the stock in Michigan Central Railroad and Bank of Michigan.

Campau held multiple public office positions. He was City Trustee in 1802, City Treasurer, City Inspector of water barrels and City Assessor, appraiser, and over-seer of the poor. In 1802, he was an original trustee of Detroit and its incorporation.

He served in the Michigan Territory Militia as captain in 1806. During the War of 1812, he was a major in the U.S. Army.

With his nephew, John R. Williams, Campau operated the Democratic Free Press and Michigan Intelligencer, which eventually evolved into the Detroit Free Press.

Personal life and death
Campau was married to Adelaide Dequindre on May 18, 1808. Their children, born through 1829, were Joseph, Adelaide, Dennis, Catherine, Jacques Joseph, Theodore Joseph, Matilda, and Alexander Timothy. His daughter Catherine married Francis Palms, the largest landowner in Michigan during the mid-1850s.

Campau bought a nine-year-old African boy in Montreal as a slave who was to be freed at 21 years of age. Campau and Father Gabriel Richard, the priest of St. Anne's Church, engaged in "heated disagreements" about Campau's having sold whiskey to Native Americans and joining the Masons. As a result, he was excommunicated from the Catholic Church in 1817.

Campau died on July 23, 1863, and was buried at Elmwood Cemetery in Detroit. The Masons held the largest funeral in the city's history until that time for Campau.

His wife was buried at Catholic Mount Elliott Cemetery, as are some of his children. His estate was worth $3 million.

Joseph Campau Street in Hamtramck and Detroit was named for him, and by association, Jos. Campau Historic District.

Joseph Campau residences

Campau lived in a log house on the south side of Jefferson Avenue, between Shelby and Griswold, that was built after the fire of 1805. Frederick E. Cohen made a painting in 1853 of Campau house that was built in 1815. It was also located between Shelby and Griswold on Jefferson Avenue.

The Joseph Campau House on 2910 East Jefferson Avenue in Detroit is attributed to Campau, but it is said that he never lived there. One of the oldest residences in Detroit, it was built on land that was originally part of the Joseph Campau farm. It came into the Campau family in 1734 when it was awarded to his grandfather.

Notes

References

 
1769 births
1863 deaths
People from Detroit
18th-century American landowners
History of Detroit
Campau family
19th-century American landowners
Burials at Elmwood Cemetery (Detroit)